Lunar Sample 14321, better known as "Big Bertha", is a lunar sample containing an embedded Earth-origin meteorite collected on the 1971 Apollo 14 mission. It was found in the Fra Mauro region of the Moon. Big Bertha is the first discovered meteorite from Earth, and the embedded meteorite portion is the oldest known Earth rock. At , this breccia rock is the third largest Moon sample returned during the Apollo program, behind Big Muley and Great Scott.

Discovery
Big Bertha was named after the famous large World War I German howitzer Big Bertha because it was the largest rock returned from the Moon up to that time.  It was collected by Apollo 14 commander Alan Shepard near the rim of Cone Crater, during the second EVA at station C1.

Transcript from the Apollo 14 Lunar Surface Journal:

[133:44:29] Mitchell: (Garbled) help with that one?

[133:44:30] Shepard: That's all right, I think I got it. There's a football-size rock, Houston, coming out of this area, which will not be bagged. It appears to be the prevalent rock of the boulders of the area. Got it?

[133:44:41] Mitchell: Got it.

Earth rock
In January 2019, research showed that a fragment (clast) embedded in Big Bertha has numerous characteristics that make it very likely to be a terrestrial (Earth) meteorite. Granite and quartz, which are commonly found on Earth but very rare to find on the Moon, were confirmed to exist in this fragment. To find the sample's age, the research team from Curtin University looked at bits of the mineral zircon embedded in its structure. "By determining the age of zircon found in the sample, we were able to pinpoint the age of the host rock at about four billion years old, making it similar to the oldest rocks on Earth", researcher Alexander Nemchin said, adding that "the chemistry of the zircon in this sample is very different from that of every other zircon grain ever analyzed in lunar samples, and remarkably similar to that of zircons found on Earth". This means Big Bertha is both the first discovered terrestrial meteorite and the oldest known Earth rock.

If the rock is indeed terrestrial, lunar geologist David Kring said that it can provide valuable information about the Hadean eon. Big Bertha shows that Earth was impacted by asteroids massive enough to produce new meteors, and granitic rocks that make up Earth's continents were already forming. Geochemist Elizabeth Bell noted that the Moon might be a better place to look for ancient Earth rocks than Earth itself, as material erodes much slower on the Moon's surface than it does on Earth, and Kring suggested the discovery of Big Bertha's nature as an Earth-origin meteorite may compel other scientists to search through Apollo lunar samples.

See also
 Big Muley
 Bench Crater meteorite 
 Hadean zircon

References 

Lunar samples
Apollo 14
Meteorites found on the Moon
Meteorites by name
Alan Shepard